Alaea salt, sometimes referred to as Hawaiian red salt, is an unrefined sea salt that has been mixed with an iron oxide rich volcanic clay called alaea, which gives the seasoning its characteristic brick red color. It is part of Native Hawaiian cuisine and is used in traditional dishes such as kalua pig, poke, and pipikaula (Hawaiian jerky). It was also traditionally used to cleanse, purify and bless tools, canoes, homes and temples. Once exported to the Pacific Northwest to cure salmon, it saw a resurgence in popularity late in the 20th century in fusion style cuisine of Hawaii both on Islands and beyond.

History

Alaea, a water-soluble colloidal ocherous earth, was used for coloring salt, which in turn was traditionally used by Hawaiians to cleanse, purify and bless tools, canoes, homes and temples. Alaea salt is also used in several native Hawaiian dishes kalua pig, poke, and pipikaula (Hawaiian jerky). In the 19th century Hawaiians began producing large amounts of alaea salt using European salt making techniques and became a leading supplier to fishermen in the Pacific Northwest for curing salmon.

It is claimed by one author that most alaea salt sold in the United States is produced in California, not in Hawaii. True Hawaiian-made alaea salt is expensive and before the rise of convenient Internet shopping was difficult to find elsewhere.

Colour
Alaea salt gets its characteristic brick red color from a volcanic Hawaiian clay called ʻalaea, which contains some 80 minerals and is rich in iron oxide.

See also

References

Edible salt
Hawaiian condiments